Ushakov Island (Ostrov Ushakova) is an isolated island located in the Arctic Ocean, Russian Federation.

Geography
Ushakov Island is located close to the region of permanent sea ice midway between Franz Josef Land and Severnaya Zemlya, at the northern limit of the Kara Sea.  
This island lies close to the limit of permanent ice; it is desolate and subject to severe Arctic storms.
This island belongs to the Taymyrsky Dolgano-Nenetsky District of the Krasnoyarsk Krai administrative division of Russia. Owing to its extreme northerly location, the sea surrounding Ushakov Island is covered with pack ice in the winter and is full of ice floes during the summer. The closest land is Vize Island  further south.

Ice cap
Ushakov Island is covered by an ice cap. The rocky ground below the icemass is flat and part of it lies below sea level.

Climate

History

This island was the last piece of undiscovered territory in the Soviet Arctic. It was finally located in 1935 when the few remaining unexplored areas in the northern Kara Sea were surveyed by Soviet hydrographic and oceanographic operations on icebreakers to study the sea and ice. 

The expedition that discovered the island was led by polar explorer, cartographer and oceanographer Georgiy Alekseevich Ushakov aboard Icebreaker Sadko, after whom the island was named. The first wintering in Ushakov Island was undertaken in 1954–55 and a polar station was established in 1954. This was abandoned during the 1980s and when an expedition visited the island in 2001, they found two small buildings partly sunken into the ice.

See also
 List of islands of Russia
 List of glaciers in Russia

References

External links
 The route over the drifting ice of Kara Sea from Frantz-Josef Land Archipelago to Ushakov Island

Islands of the Kara Sea
Exploration of the Arctic
Polar exploration by Russia and the Soviet Union
Populated places of Arctic Russia
Islands of Krasnoyarsk Krai
Arctic expeditions